Varcoe is a surname. Notable people with the surname include:

 Helen Varcoe (1907–1995), English swimmer
 Jeremy Varcoe (born 1937), British diplomat
 Stephen Varcoe (born 1948), English bass-baritone
 Travis Varcoe, (born 1988), Australian rules footballer

See also
 Vercoe